In 2009, much greater international resolution has resulted in more control of piracy than in the prior decade, although many pirates still operate from Somalia.
On 2 January a Netherlands Antilles-registered cargo ship was attacked by pirates in the Gulf of Aden.  A Danish antipiracy ship, the Absalon, sent an armed helicopter that fired warning shots and flares.  The pirate speedboat caught fire and sank.
On 5 January, a Sierra Leone cargo vessel was attacked and chased by 4 pirate vessels in the Gulf of Aden.  The ship escaped.
On August 27, Somali Pirates aboard M/V Win Far fired a large caliber weapon at a U.S. Navy SH-60B assigned to the USS Chancellorsville.

References

http://www.cargolaw.com/presentations_casualties.php
http://www.icc-ccs.org/index.php?option=com_content&view=article&id=308:weekly-piracy-report&catid=32:weekly-piracy-report&Itemid=10

Piracy
Piracy by year